The following is a list of state highways in Maryland shorter than one mile (1.6 km) in length with route numbers between 2 and 699. Most of these highways act as service roads, old alignments of more prominent highways, or connectors between one or more highways. Many of these highways are unsigned and have multiple segments with the same number. Several of these highways have their own articles; those highways are summarized here and a link is provided to the main article. This list does not include highways where at least one highway of that number is at least one mile in length. All highways at least one mile in length have their own article. The highways shorter than one mile with the same number are covered in the main article for the highway.



MD 79

Maryland Route 79 is the designation for the state-maintained portion of Petersville Road, which runs  from MD 17 and MD 464 in Rosemont north to a bridge over the Little Catoctin Creek on the northern border of Rosemont. MD 79 begins at a four-way intersection on the boundary between the town of Brunswick to the south and the village of Rosemont to the north.  Petersville Road continues south as MD 17 into Brunswick; MD 17 also heads west along Burkittsville Road.  The eastern leg of the intersection is MD 464 (Souder Road). MD 79 heads northeast as a two-lane undivided road through a residential area where the highway meets the eastern end of Rosemont Drive, which is unsigned MD 871G.  The state highway comes to its northern terminus at a bridge over Little Catoctin Creek on the northern border of Rosemont. Past the northern terminus, Petersville Road continues north as a county road toward MD 180 (Jefferson Pike) in Petersville. 

When state highways were first numbered in Maryland in 1927, the portion of Petersville Road south of what is now Rosemont Drive became MD 33; MD 33 became MD 17 in 1940. Petersville Road from Rosemont north to Petersville was later marked as MD 79. MD 79's modern bridge over Little Catoctin Creek was built in 1941 after the previous bridge was carried away by a flood that year. MD 79 was extended south to its current southern terminus in 1968 when MD 17 was relocated to its present course through Rosemont and MD 464 was extended west along Souder Road to its present terminus to form the fourth leg of that intersection. On October 31, 2016, the northern terminus of MD 79 was cut back from MD 180 to its current location when the section of Petersville Road between the Little Catoctin Creek bridge on the northern border of Rosemont and MD 180 was transferred to county maintenance.

MD 169

Maryland Route 169 is the designation for Maple Road, a  state highway in Linthicum in northwestern Anne Arundel County. The highway begins at Hammonds Ferry Road and heads east as a two-lane undivided road through a residential area. MD 169 has a grade crossing of MTA Maryland's Baltimore Light RailLink just prior to its intersection with MD 170 (Camp Meade Road). The highway reaches its eastern terminus at MD 648 (Baltimore–Annapolis Boulevard).

MD 172

Maryland Route 172 is the unsigned designation for Arundel Cove Avenue, a  route that runs from railroad tracks in Orchard Beach in Anne Arundel County north to MD 173 (Hawkins Point Road) in the city of Baltimore.  This state highway once served as the entrance to the United States Coast Guard Yard.  The yard is now accessed from MD 173 just to the west of MD 172.  MD 172 was constructed by 1930.

MD 181

Maryland Route 181 is the unsigned designation for the Sixth Street drawbridge over the Spa Creek in Annapolis, Anne Arundel County.

MD 219

Maryland Route 219 is the unsigned designation for Ninth Street, a two-lane undivided road which runs  from the intersection of US 219 and MD 135 north to High Street within Oakland in Garrett County.  MD 219 is state-maintained from US 219 to Green Street and maintained by the town of Oakland from there to High Street.  The state highway follows the southernmost part of the alignment of the future Oakland Bypass.

MD 221

Maryland Route 221A is the unsigned designation for a  section of Ritchie–Marlboro Road around that highway's dumbbell interchange with I-95/I-495 (Capital Beltway) at Exit 13 in Largo, Prince George's County.

MD 250

Maryland Route 250A is the unsigned designation for Old Virginia Road, which runs  from US 13 Business east to the intersection of US 13 and US 113 within Pocomoke City in Worcester County.  The state highway is the southernmost part of the second alignment of US 113 in Pocomoke City.  MD 250A was assigned shortly after US 113 was rolled back to terminate at the Pocomoke City Bypass, US 13, in the 1960s.

MD 268

Maryland Route 268, which is known as North Street, runs  from Main Street north to MD 279 within the town of Elkton in eastern Cecil County. The highway begins at Main Street, which is one-way eastbound, in downtown Elkton; the parallel street that allows westbound traffic and provides access to Union Hospital and MD 213 (Bridge Street) is High Street one block to the north. MD 268 heads north as a two-lane undivided road and passes a block to the east of the Elkton Armory. The highway veers slightly to the west to cross over Amtrak's Northeast Corridor railroad line. The old alignment, Old North Road, consists of pair of stubs on the south and north sides of the tracks with unsigned designations MD 727 and MD 727A, respectively. MD 268 continues north between Big Elk Creek to the east and Elkton Middle School to the west before reaching its northern terminus at MD 279, which heads west as Newark Avenue and east as Elkton Road toward Newark, Delaware.

MD 268 is the old alignment of MD 279 within Elkton. North Street was paved as a  concrete road by 1921. The original North Street overpass of the Pennsylvania Railroad (now Amtrak) was constructed between 1930 and 1934. The bypassed street stubs to the closed grade crossing were designated MD 727 and MD 727A in 1949. MD 268 was assigned to North Avenue after MD 279 was extended west to US 40 to bypass the center of Elkton in 1968. The highway's current bridge across the Amtrak Northeast Corridor was constructed between 1986 and 1988.

References

MD 284

Maryland Route 284 is the designation for Hemphill Street, which runs  between two intersections with MD 285 in Chesapeake City in southern Cecil County. MD 284 heads north from MD 285 (Biddle Street) one block north of the Chesapeake & Delaware Canal in the town of Chesapeake City. Immediately after leaving the town limits, the two-lane undivided highway curves to the west and reaches its northern terminus at MD 285 (Lock Street). MD 285 heads north to a junction with MD 213 (Augustine Herman Highway).

Hemphill Street was part of the original Cecilton–Elkton highway passing through Chesapeake City that was designated for improvement by the Maryland State Roads Commission in 1909. The highway through Chesapeake City was paved as a  concrete road in 1915. At that time, the main highway entered Chesapeake City from the north along Hemphill Street, crossed the Chesapeake & Delaware Canal on a one-lane bridge, turned west and crossed Back Creek on a wooden bridge, turned south onto Bohemia Street in South Chesapeake City, turned west onto Third Street, and turned south onto George Street to leave the town.

In the 1920s, the U.S. Army Corps of Engineers widened, straightened, and deepened the canal. As part of their work, the agency constructed a vertical lift bridge across the canal. Between 1924 and 1926, the Maryland State Roads Commission constructed approaches to the new bridge on both sides of the expanded canal, eliminating two narrow and dangerous bridges and four right-angle turns in Chesapeake City. The new route along George Street and Lock Street, which became part of US 213 in 1927 and is now MD 285 and MD 537, entirely bypassed what is now MD 284. MD 284 was resurfaced with bituminous concrete in 1976, and its junction with MD 285 was changed from a tangent to the present orthogonal intersection in 1982.

References

MD 308

Maryland Route 308 is the designation for a portion of South Main Street in Federalsburg, Caroline County running from MD 313/MD 318 north to the end of state maintenance, where South Main Street continues north as a municipal street. Although not signposted, it does appear in official documents and some commercial maps.

MD 324

MD 327

Maryland Route 327, which is known as Ikea Way, runs  from MD 7 east to a dead end within the town of Perryville in southwestern Cecil County. MD 327 begins at an intersection with MD 7 (Broad Street) on the eastern edge of the town of Perryville. The state highway heads southeast as a two-lane undivided road and crosses over Amtrak's Northeast Corridor railroad line. MD 327 comes to an intersection with Marion Tapp Parkway, which leads to the entrance of the adjacent Perryville Wastewater Treatment Plant and to Perryville Community Park located at the Perry Point promontory east of the Perry Point VA Medical Center property. From here, the route passes south of an IKEA distribution center before it reaches a dead end. 

In a March 8, 1967, agreement, the Maryland State Roads Commission agreed to transfer maintenance of part of MD 7 and all of MD 271 to the town of Perryville upon the completion of a new highway and bridge from MD 7 across the Pennsylvania Railroad (now Amtrak) to serve the peninsula south of the railroad between Mill Creek and Furnace Bay. The new highway, designated MD 327, was constructed in 1968, the same year Firestone Plastics opened a chemical plant on the present site of the IKEA distribution center. The state highway had no name as of 1999; it was designated Firestone Road in 2001 and Ikea Way in 2004 shortly after the opening of the IKEA distribution center. In 2018, MD 327 was extended east from Marion Tapp Parkway to a dead end after it was determined that stretch of Ikea Way was maintained by the state.

References

MD 334

Maryland Route 334 is a state highway in Talbot County that runs along two-lane undivided Port Street from MD 322 on the western edge of the town of Easton, eastward to Washington Street. MD 334 starts in the west at the intersection with MD 322 (Easton Parkway), where Port Street continues west as a county road toward a dead end along the Tred Avon River.  It passes through a somewhat rural side of the town, changing quickly to a residential corridor. East of the Clay Street intersection, the road becomes municipally maintained. The route comes to its eastern terminus at Washington Street.

MD 368

Maryland Route 368 is the designation for St. Martins Neck Road, a  spur that runs from the beginning of state maintenance north to MD 367 in Bishopville.  St. Martins Neck Road continues southeast as a county highway to Isle of Wight, where it has an at-grade intersection with MD 90 (Ocean City Expressway).  MD 368 originally also included present day MD 568 and MD 367 between the two roads; MD 368 was shortened to its present length in 1950.

MD 375

Maryland Route 375 is the unsigned designation for Commerce Street, a  street that runs one-way west (officially north) from MD 818 (Main Street) to MD 374 (Broad Street) within downtown Berlin.

MD 377

Maryland Route 377 is the designation for Williams Street, which runs  from MD 376 in the Berlin Commercial District north to MD 346 (Old Ocean City Boulevard) just west of US 113 within Berlin.

MD 384

Maryland Route 384 runs  from MD 390 east to US 29 and MD 97 in Silver Spring, providing access to the Silver Spring station of the Washington Metro.

MD 393

Maryland Route 393 (Old Solomons Island Road) is an old alignment of Maryland Route 2 through Annapolis and Parole in Anne Arundel County. Its alignment runs from MD 2 north of MD 665 northerly to MD 450.

MD 430

Maryland Route 430 is the unsigned designation for Greenbelt Road, which runs  from US 1 east to MD 193 within College Park.  MD 430 serves to complete movements missing from the US 1-MD 193 interchange to the north of MD 430's western terminus.

MD 432

Maryland Route 432 is the unsigned designation for Glen Oaks Lane, which runs  from the intersection of Guilford Road and Oakland Mills Road east to a cul-de-sac adjacent to I-95's interchange with MD 32 (Exit 38) in Columbia.

MD 449

Maryland Route 449 is the unsigned designation for the  section of Shallcross Wharf Road from MD 213 east to MD 444 near Locust Grove in northern Kent County. The course of MD 449 and Shallcross Wharf Road northeast to Old Locust Grove Road were part of the original Chestertown–Galena highway proposed for improvement as a state road in 1909. This stretch was constructed as a  macadam road in 1912. After US 213's bypass of Locust Grove was built in 1950 and 1951, the old path of US 213 through Locust Grove—Shallcross Wharf Road between the western end of the bypass and the center of Locust Grove, and Old Locust Grove Road between the center of Locust Grove and the eastern end of the bypass—became part of MD 444, with what is now MD 449 being a spur of the main route. After MD 444's present course west of Locust Grove was constructed in 1968, Old Locust Grove Road became MD 447, and the  portion of Shallcross Wharf Road between US 213 and the new MD 447 became MD 449. MD 449 was resurfaced with bituminous concrete in 1984. Three years later, MD 449 was transferred from state to county maintenance through a December 1, 1987, road transfer agreement. However, the portion of MD 449 between MD 213 and MD 444 was returned to state control to be destroyed, but the highway remained in use. Thus, in 1997, MD 449 was returned to the inventory of the state highway system.

References

MD 460

Maryland Route 460, which is known as Hall Highway, runs  from McCready Memorial Hospital east to MD 413 within Crisfield in southwestern Somerset County. The highway begins just north of the McCready Memorial Hospital property on a peninsula between Daugherty Creek and the Little Annemessex River. The roadway continues north as county-maintained Byrd Road. MD 460 heads south, entering the city limits of Crisfield and passing through the hospital grounds, where the highway is flanked by perpendicular parking spaces. The state highway turns east and crosses the Little Annemessex River, then passes through a residential neighborhood where the highway intersects Wynfall Avenue, which provides full access to MD 413. MD 460 reaches its eastern terminus at southbound MD 413 (Maryland Avenue). There is no direct access to northbound MD 413 (Richardson Avenue). McCready Memorial Hospital was founded in 1923 as a memorial to Edward W. McCready, a cork industry scion and Crisfield native who was killed in a train–automobile collision on the Crisfield–Westover road in 1919. MD 460 was constructed around 1933 to provide a more direct connection between the hospital and the populated areas of Crisfield.

MD 485

Maryland Route 485 is the unsigned designation for Saathoff Road, an old alignment of MD 404 that runs  between two intersections with MD 404 east of Hillsboro.

MD 485A is the designation for Shady Oak Lane, a  stub from MD 485 just west of MD 485's eastern terminus that is part of the old alignment of MD 404.  MD 485A is signed as MD 485.

MD 490

Maryland Route 490 is the signed designation for a  section of Union Avenue from Commerce Street north to MD 7, which turns north from Revolution Street onto Union Avenue at MD 490's northern terminus.

MD 518

Maryland Route 518 is the unsigned designation for First Street in the town of Queen Anne, Talbot County from Maryland Route 404 Alternate to the Queen Anne's County line.

MD 524

It intersects the eastern terminus of MD 521.

MD 526

Maryland Route 526A is the unsigned designation for an unnamed road running  from MD 140 northeast to Woodfield Court northwest of Reisterstown, Baltimore County. The route was designated in 2014.

MD 535

Maryland Route 535A (Auth Road) connects county-maintained Auth Road with the ramp to Maryland Route 5 in Camp Springs, Prince George's County.

MD 537

Maryland Route 537 is a collection of unsigned state highways in the U.S. state of Maryland. These two existing highways and two former sections of state highway are segments of old alignment of U.S. Route 213 (US 213), which is now MD 213, in Chesapeake City in southern Cecil County. Some of the roads that became segments of MD 537 were constructed in the mid-1910s as part of the original state road between Elkton and Cecilton. Other portions of MD 537 were part of the approach roads to a bridge across the Chesapeake & Delaware Canal that was built in the mid-1920s and destroyed in 1942. After the modern Chesapeake City Bridge and its approach roads were completed in 1949, US 213 was moved to the new bridge and approach roads and MD 537 was assigned to the bypassed sections of US 213. Much of MD 537 outside of Chesapeake City was transferred to county maintenance in the late 1950s. In 2015, the remaining section of MD 537 north of the canal was turned over to municipal maintenance.

References

MD 553

Maryland Route 553 is the unsigned designation for sections of Old South River Road, near Maryland Route 2 in Anne Arundel County, together totaling  in length:
 553A begins at a signalled intersection with MD 2 and Virginia Avenue, travelling north to the road's end and intersecting Leeland Road. In 2015, the northern terminus was shortened by  due to the installation of a gate.
 553B begins at road's end and travels north to MD 2 at Oak Grove Road.
 553C is called South River Road, and travels from MD 553B to MD 2.
 553D is the designation for Leeland Road, which runs from MD 553A east to an unnamed road.

MD 568

Maryland Route 568 is the designation for Hatchery Road, a  spur that runs from MD 367 in Bishopville north to the Delaware state line, where the highway continues as Bishopville Road toward an intersection with Delaware Route 54 (DE 54) east of Selbyville.  MD 568 was originally a segment of MD 368; the roads received their present designations in 1950.

MD 584

Maryland Route 584 is the unsigned designation for a short loop to the west of MD 5 along Old State House Road and Trinity Church Road in Saint Mary's City in Saint Mary's County.

MD 591

Maryland Route 591 is the designation for a pair of state highways parallel to U.S. Route 1 on either side of Octoraro Creek near Conowingo in northwestern Cecil County.
MD 591A is named Colora Road. The  route extends from an oblique intersection with US 1 opposite Connelly Road to a barrier on the north side of Octoraro Creek.
MD 591B is named Porters Bridge Road. The  highway extends from a barrier on the south side of Octoraro Creek, just east of which the route crosses Love Run, to a tangent intersection with US 1.

The first bridge at Richardsmere was constructed to serve Richard Porter's mill on the northwest side of Octoraro Creek in the late 18th century. A wooden covered bridge was constructed at the site around 1858 and washed away in a flood in 1884. A metal Pratt through truss bridge was constructed to replace Porter's Bridge in 1885. This truss bridge served the original state road, later designated US 1 in 1927. The state road west toward Conowingo was paved in 1911, and the state road east toward Rising Sun was completed by 1919. MD 591 was assigned to the route using Porters Bridge after US 1 was relocated and a new bridge upstream from Porters Bridge was completed in 1934. Porters Bridge was closed in January 1978 after a storm caused irreparable damage to the eastern approach to the bridge. The severely deteriorated bridge was scheduled to be dismantled in 2001.

References

MD 617

Maryland Route 617 is the unsigned designation for an unnamed road connecting Maryland Route 16A (Beauchamp Branch Road) north to Maryland Route 16 (Harmony Road) in Caroline County.

MD 631

Maryland Route 631 is the unsigned designation for Old Brandywine Road, a  spur south from the intersection of MD 373 and Brandywine Road south to a dead end adjacent to the US 301–MD 5 interchange in Brandywine.

MD 636

Maryland Route 636 is the designation for Warrior Drive, which runs  from MD 53 east to US 220 within Cresaptown, crossing Warrior Run twice.  The westbound direction of MD 636 is used by traffic from US 220 to access MD 53.  MD 636 was under construction by 1936 and completed by 1938.

MD 637

Maryland Route 637 is the designation for Naylor Road, which connects Maryland Route 5 with the Washington, D.C. Line in Prince George's County. The only signage for the route exists along MD 5.

MD 640

Maryland Route 640 is the designation for a part of Revells Neck Road in Somerset County running from U.S. Route 13 west to the Eastern Correctional Institution. Around 1946, a much larger section of Revells Neck Road was designated MD 697.

MD 642

Maryland Route 642 is the unsigned designation for Greenland Beach Road, a  spur that runs east from MD 173 (Fort Smallwood Road) in Orchard Beach.  The state highway is the old alignment of MD 173 just west of Stony Creek.  MD 642 was assigned around 1947 when the present bridge over Stony Creek was completed.

MD 644

Maryland Route 644 is the unsigned designation for two short spurs off US 1 in Arbutus, Baltimore County.
MD 644C follows Linden Avenue Spur, which runs from Linden Avenue and Sulphur Spring Road east to US 1. The roadway was built in 1948 and designated MD 644C in 2012.
MD 644D follows Selma Avenue Spur, which runs from Selma Avenue east to US 1. The roadway was built in 1948 and designated MD 644D in 2012.

MD 645

Maryland Route 645 is the unsigned designation for two segments of Old Dorsey Road in Harmans, Anne Arundel County.
MD 645B follows Old Dorsey Road from Railroad Avenue east to a dead end.
MD 645D follows Old Dorsey Road from MD 645B north to MD 176.

MD 652

Maryland Route 652 is the designation for Old Telegraph Road, which runs  from a dead end north to MD 176 in Harmans, Anne Arundel County.

MD 656

Maryland Route 656 is the designation for Friels Road, which runs  from MD 18 next to the Queenstown Premium Outlets east to MD 456 within Queenstown.

MD 658

Maryland Route 658 is a state highway that runs  from MD 53 north to US 40 Alternate within La Vale. The highway west of I-68 is part of US 220 Truck, which provides access from eastbound I-68 to southbound US 220 in Cresaptown for trucks due to a truck prohibition on the eastbound exit ramp for I-68's interchange with US 220. MD 658 begins at an intersection with MD 53 (Winchester Road) and heads northeast as Vocke Road, a four-lane divided highway. The state highway passes the Country Club Mall and the District 6 offices of the Maryland State Highway Administration before intersecting a segment of Braddock Road, which is unsigned MD 949. MD 658 intersects entrance and exit ramps from Exit 40 of eastbound I-68 and US 40 (National Freeway). The highway passes under the freeway and meets an exit ramp from westbound I-68 and the western terminus of MD 49 (Braddock Road) at the next intersection, where the highway's name changes to Campground Road. MD 658 turns north, crossing Braddock Run, and reduces to a four-lane undivided highway before reaching its northern terminus at US 40 Alternate (National Pike). MD 658 was assigned to Campground Road as a connector between US 40 and MD 49 in 1939. The state highway was extended south along Vocke Road to MD 53 around 1948. MD 658 was expanded to a divided highway from MD 53 to MD 49 around 1972 in conjunction with the construction of I-68 through La Vale.
MD 658A is the designation for Service Road, which runs  from the intersection of MD 658 and MD 949 north to the end of state maintenance. The route was designated in 2014.

MD 660

Maryland Route 660 is the unsigned designation for Dodge Street, which runs  from MD 355 north to MD 28 in Rockville, Montgomery County.

MD 668

Maryland Route 668 is the unsigned designation for Boswells Drive, a road that runs  from Harvey Yingling Road north to a dead end parallel to the southbound side of MD 30 just south of the Pennsylvania state line north of Manchester in northeastern Carroll County.

MD 672

Maryland Route 672 is the unsigned designation for a portion of Greenbury Point Road northeast of Annapolis in Anne Arundel County, running  from MD 648 east to the end of state maintenance.

MD 673

Maryland Route 673 is the designation for Sam Barnes Road, a short road that connects Maryland Route 413 to U.S. Route 13 in Somerset County. The route is a former piece of MD 413; it was created when MD 413 and US 13 were realigned. MD 673 provides the only access from northbound US 13 to southbound MD 413. The route also grants access to the Somerset County Recreation and Parks facility as well as the county sheriff's office.

MD 674

Maryland Route 674 is the designation for the  portion of Sharp Street from the town limit of Rock Hall at Grays Inn Creek east to MD 20 in western Kent County. MD 674 was constructed along the portion of Sharp Street from Chesapeake Avenue at Sharps Wharf to MD 445 (Main Street) in 1940. The portion of Sharp Street east of MD 445 has been constructed as a concrete road as part of MD 20 in 1920. MD 20 through Rock Hill, including Sharp Street, was widened and resurfaced with bituminous concrete in 1947 and 1948. MD 674 was extended east from MD 445 to its present eastern terminus at MD 20 after MD 20 was relocated onto Rock Hall Avenue east of MD 445 in 1959 and 1960. The portion of the highway west of MD 445 was reconstructed in a streetscape project in 1981 and 1982, and the current length of the highway outside the town was reconstructed similarly in 1989. The town of Rock Hall agreed to assume maintenance for MD 674 west of Grays Inn Creek through a June 14, 1995, road transfer agreement. The transfer was conditional on the state completing a streetscape project on the highway east of MD 445. MD 674 was reduced to its current length after the streetscape project was completed in 1996. MD 674 had an auxiliary route, MD 674A, that served as a  one-way ramp from eastbound MD 674 to MD 20 at the former highway's eastern terminus. MD 674A was assigned to the ramp by 1975, and the route was removed and the roadway abandoned in 1996.

References

MD 694

Maryland Route 694 is the unsigned designation for Agricultural Farm Road, a  service road that extends from MD 212 (officially MD 212A) south to U.S. government property in Beltsville. It could be mistaken as a driveway sometimes.

See also

References

External links

State highways in Maryland shorter than one mile (2-699)
 State highways shorter than one mile 002
Maryland